"Johnny I Hardly Knew Ye" (Roud 3137), also known as "Johnny We Hardly Knew Ye" or "Johnny I Hardly Knew Ya", is a popular traditional song, sung to the same tune as "When Johnny Comes Marching Home".  First published in London in 1867 and written by Joseph B. Geoghegan, a prolific English songwriter and successful music hall figure, it remained popular in Britain and Ireland and the United States into the early years of the 20th century.  The song was recorded by The Clancy Brothers & Tommy Makem on their eponymous album in 1961, leading to a renewal of its popularity.

Originally seen as humorous, the song today is considered a powerful anti-war song.  Except for an initial framing stanza, the song is a monologue by an Irish woman who meets her former lover on the road to Athy, which is located in County Kildare, Ireland.  After their illegitimate child was born, the lover ran away and became a soldier.  He was badly disfigured, losing his legs, his arms, his eyes and, in some versions, his nose, in fighting on the island of "Sulloon", or Ceylon (now known as Sri Lanka), and will have to be put in (or, in some versions, with) a bowl to beg.  In spite of all this, the woman says, she is happy to see him and will keep him on as her lover. Modern versions often end with an anti-war affirmation.

The song has often been supposed to be an anti-recruiting song and to have been written in Ireland in the late 18th or early 19th century, at the time of or in response to the Kandyan Wars, which were fought in Sri Lanka between 1795 and 1818. It has also been widely speculated that "When Johnny Comes Marching Home", which in actuality was published in 1863, four years earlier than "Johnny I Hardly Knew Ye", was a rewrite of "Johnny I Hardly Knew Ye" to make it more pro-war. However, a recent study by Jonathan Lighter, Lecturer in English at the University of Tennessee and editor of the Historical Dictionary of American Slang, has shown that these suppositions are incorrect since “Johnny I Hardly Knew Ye” originally had a different melody.

Variations
 The repeating chorus line "With your drums and guns and drums and guns" is sometimes sung as "With your drums and guns and guns and drums", or "We had guns and drums and drums and guns", as in the Dropkick Murphys version.
 "Why did ye run from me and the child?" sometimes replaces "Why did ye skedaddle from me and the child?"
"Where are the legs with which you run?" sometimes replaces "Where are the legs that used to run?", often also accompanied by a change from "When you went to carry a gun" to "When first you went to carry a gun", such as in the version performed by The Clancy Brothers.
 In some versions, the final lines are sung as:

 Steeleye Span recorded an adaptation of the song, called "Fighting For Strangers", on their 1976 album Rocket Cottage. Their version is substantially different, but bears the refrain "Johnny, what've they done to you" or "Johnny what'll happen to you". The other similarity is in the last verse:

 The song "English Civil War" from The Clash's 1978 album Give 'Em Enough Rope incorporates melody and lyrics from the original.
 The Rugby song "I Met a Whore in the Park" goes to the tune of the song.
 The Dutch song "Vannacht" by Pater Moeskroen also goes by the tune of this song.
 P J Harvey's 2011 song "Let England Shake" modifies and incorporates the line, "Indeed your dancing days are done"
 The villains in the 2001 film The Luck of the Irish sang the song during a victory feast.
 The song "Hip Hurray" on the Fiddler's Green's 1995 album King Shepherd retains some of the lyrics while using a different melody and additional lyrics to create a reflection on the original song.
 Marc Gunn and Jamie Haeuser recorded it on their album How America Saved Irish Music (2014)

Reusage of the title
 Johnny We Hardly Knew Ye: A book by Kenneth O'Donnell and David Powers about the truncated presidency of John F. Kennedy published in 1972.
 Daddy, We Hardly Knew You: Germaine Greer, London, 1989
 Johnny, I Hardly Knew You: Edna O'Brien, London, 1977

Select recordings

You can help by expanding this section
 1959 – Tommy Makem – The Newport Folk Festival, Vol. 1
 1960 – Bud & Travis – ...In Concert
 1961 – The Clancy Brothers and Tommy Makem
 1961 – The Chad Mitchell Trio (blended with "When Johnny Comes Marching Home Again")
 1961 – Maureen O'Hara
 1963 – Anita Carter
 1965 – The Leprechauns... "14 Irish Folk Songs"
 1969 – Frida Boccara – Un jour, un enfant
 1972 – Unknown – To Lord Byron
 1982 – Susan Dunn – Recital with Pianoforte
 1986 – Benjamin Luxon (vocals) and Bill Crofut (Banjo) on "Folksongs at Tanglewood" – Omega Records OCD3003
 1986 – Easterhouse – Contenders – "Johnny I Hardly Knew You"
 1989 - Hamish Imlach - Portrait LP - "Johhny, I Hardly Knew Ye"
 1991 – Guns N' Roses – Civil War Axl Rose whistles a part of the melody on the beginning of the song.
 1994 – Vlad Tepes – "Wladimir's March" instrumental intro track, a version of this song
 1993 – Joan Baez – Rare, Live & Classic
 1994 – The Cranberries, in "Zombie", sing "With their tanks and their bombs, and their bombs, and their guns" – a reference to the chorus of this song.
 2001 – The Tossers – Communication & Conviction: Last Seven Years
 2002 – Isla St Clair – on the album Amazing Grace – anthems to inspire
 2002 – Faye Ringel – on the album Hot Chestnuts
 2002 - Glenn Yarbrough - on the album Here We Go Baby!
 2003 – The Irish Rovers – on the album Live In Concert
 2006 – The tune of "Johnny I Hardly Knew Ye" can be heard in the 5th episode of 18th season in "The Simpsons"
 2007 – Dropkick Murphys – The Meanest of Times
 2008 – Karan Casey – Ships in the Forest
 2008 – Tracy Smith – Taverns and Tall Ships
 2009 – Janis Ian – Essential Janis Ian (recorded earlier)
 2009 – Susan McKeown and Lorin Sklamberg – Saints & Tzadiks – "Prayer for the Dead"
 2011 – duYun – Shark in You
 2012 – Foreign Feathers perform a version on It Could Be Worse.
 2012 – Vintage Wine – Drums and Guns
 2013 – Patty Duke – Patty Duke Sings Folk Songs – Time to Move On
 2013 – Santiano – Mit Den Gezeiten
 2013 – Marisa Anderson – Traditional and Public Domain Songs
 2016 – The McMiners – Country Cross
 2017 – Ferocious Dog – The Red Album
 2017 – Teufelstanz – Camera Obscura

See also
List of anti-war songs
When Johnny Comes Marching Home

Notes

References
Lighter, Jonathan (2012).  "The Best Antiwar Song Ever Written," Occasional Papers in Folklore No. 1.  CAMSCO Music and Loomis House Press.  

1867 songs
Anti-war songs
Athy
British Ceylon
Drinking songs
Dropkick Murphys songs
Irish folk songs
Songs about soldiers
Songs about the military